The James Preserve (also known as the Darwin James Preserve) is a nature preserve located on Long Island in the village of Old Brookville in Nassau County, New York, and connected to Greenvale.

The  preserve was maintained by The Nature Conservancy prior to being transferred to the North Shore Land Alliance in 2015. People infer it was a former farm seeing as there are abandoned buildings, likely barns, with farming tools inside. It contains a swamp and a river with a bridge crossing over it. A trail within the preserve leads to Valentines Lane, which leads to another nature preserve, Louis C. Clark Sanctuary.

References

Protected areas of Nassau County, New York
Nature reserves in New York (state)